19th Avenue and Junipero Serra / 19th Avenue and Randolph stations are a pair of light rail stops on the Muni Metro M Ocean View line, located in the Merced Heights neighborhood of San Francisco, California. The inbound stop is located on 19th Avenue at Junipero Serra Boulevard, while outbound trains stop on 19th Avenue at Randolph Avenue. They opened with the line on October 6, 1925. The line was replaced with buses on August 6, 1939, but streetcar service resumed on December 17, 1944.

Inbound and outbound trains stop at opposite ends of the block. Inbound trains stop before crossing Junipero Serra Boulevard, while outbound trains stop before crossing Randolph Street. (A separate stop, labeled 19th Avenue and Randolph in both directions, is located two blocks to the southeast.) The stop has no platforms, trains stop at marked poles and passengers cross a vehicle travel lanes on 19th Avenue to board and depart trains. The stop is not accessible to people with disabilities.

The stop is also served by the  route which provides service along the M Ocean View line during the early morning when trains do not operate.

References

External links 

SFMTA – 19th Ave & Junipero Serra Blvd, 19th Ave & Randolph St
SFBay Transit (unofficial) – 19th Ave & Junipero Serra Blvd, 19th Ave & Randolph St

Muni Metro stations